British Channel Island Ferries (BCIF) was a ferry operator who ran services between the United Kingdom and the Channel Islands.

History

Channel Island Ferries
The company was founded in late 1984 as Channel Island Ferries by a consortium made up of Brittany Ferries, Huelin Renouf and Mainland Market Deliveries (MMD) to compete with Sealink British Ferries services to Portsmouth and Weymouth. Channel Island Ferries established their service from Portsmouth to the Channel Islands late in March 1985 using the ferry Corbière, previously the Benodet of Brittany Ferries. Sealink British Ferries had made a number of unpopular changes to its services and fare structure for the 1985 season which resulted in Channel Island Ferries gaining 85% of the passenger market from Portsmouth, this later dropped to 55% in 1986 after Sealink reorganised their fares and sailings to combat Channel Island Ferries following massive losses. The company had made such an impact on the Channel Island market that Sealink entered into talks to merge the two companies operations to save money and reduce over-capacity. The joint venture was announced on 30 September 1986. The plans was for the new company to be known as British Channel Island Ferries and operate the Corbiere and Sealink's Earl Granville from Portsmouth and maintain a summer only service from Weymouth using another Sealink vessel. The announcement resulted in almost immediate strike action by the crews of the four Sealink vessels which included the blockade of Guernsey's only linkspan by the Earl William forcing Channel Island Ferries to suspend service to the island for five days, the service resumed after Earl William sailed to Weymouth to join the other Sealink ships on strike. 

Sealink were unable to reach an agreement with their crew to join the new service which meant Sealink were not able to fulfil its agreement to provide the Earl Granville and another ship for the new service. Channel Island Ferries later took out a series of high court injunctions against Sealink which allowed Channel Island Ferries to trade as British Channel Island Ferries and prevented Sealink for offering a service to the Islands for twelve months

British Channel Island Ferries
With only one ship the company required two additional vessels to run a full service to the Channel Islands.  They chartered the Brittany Ferries freight ferry Briezh-Izel to run alongside the Corbière from Portsmouth and the Portelet to run a new service from Weymouth which was to last until 1 October 1988.  The service from Portsmouth was maintained until the end of 1988 when BCIF moved to Poole which allowed the company to reduce crossing times to the Islands by up to two hours.  Corbière was replaced by the Rozel on the new service in February 1989. The Rozel was the largest ship ever used on the Channel Island service and became a popular addition to the fleet. The Briezh-Izel was initially replaced by the Corbière running freight only until the arrival of the Havelet, formerly the Cornouailles, from Brittany Ferries' Truckline service. The Corbière then left the fleet for further service with Brittany Ferries on their Truckline passenger service between Poole and Cherbourg.  The move to Poole and the introduction of the Rozel was a successful one for the company but growth in the freight market from the port was slow, this led to the establishment of a rival service from Portsmouth by Commodore Shipping and MMD.  BCIF was also facing growing competition from air travel and Condor Ferries passenger-only services from Weymouth.

Downfall
In late summer 1991 it was announced that the company had not renewed the charter of the Rozel and that she would be replaced by the Reine Mathilde from Brittany Ferries which was renamed Beauport.  This ship was smaller and not as popular with passengers as the Rozel and was one of the contributing factors to the downfall of the company.  In 1993 Condor Ferries introduced a high speed catamaran service from Weymouth to the Channel Island for passengers and vehicles. This was to have a significant effect on BCIF who operated a reduced passenger service for that season and were involved in a price war with Condor.  Passenger numbers fell significantly and the charter of the Beauport was not renewed at the end of 1993. The company planned that the Havelet would be their main passenger ship for the 1994 season with the Truckline vessel Purbeck being brought as freight ship.  In January 1994 it was announced that British Channel Island Ferries had been bought by Commodore Shipping, freight services were transferred to Commodore Ferries at Portsmouth and passenger operations moved to Condor at Weymouth where the Havelet would run a conventional service alongside the Condor 10.

Fleet
Corbiere 1985-1989
Portelet 1987-1988
Briezh-Izel 1987-1989
Rozel 1989-1992
Havelet 1989-1994
Sylbe 1990-1993
Beauport 1992-1993
Purbeck 1994

Throughout its years of operation the company also chartered a number of Brittany Ferries vessels for use during refit periods. These included the Armorique, Coutances, Duchesse Anne and also the Reine Mathilde and Purbeck prior to them becoming part of the BCIF fleet in 1992 and 1994 respectively.

Routes
Portsmouth - Channel Islands 1986-1988
Weymouth - Channel Islands 1987-1988
Poole - Channel Islands 1989-1994

Former BCIF routes today
British Channel Island Ferries passenger services were taken over by Condor Ferries in 1994. The Havelet operated a conventional passenger service with the company until late 1996 when she was laid up.  She would later re-enter service with Condor after reliability problems with the Condor Express and demands from Islanders for a reliable winter service.  Havelet was eventually replaced by the Commodore Clipper which returned conventional Channel Island services to Portsmouth in 1999.  The Purbeck spent a short time with Commodore Ferries before being chartered out to a variety of companies including Brittany Ferries on a number of occasions. She remained under the ownership of Channel Island Ferries until she was sold to Interisland Line in 2003 and later a South American company in early 2007 .

Condor Ferries established a fast ferry service from Poole in 1997 and now maintain a summer service to the Islands and St Malo from the port.

Corbière House, the Poole headquarters of the company until its demise still retains a BCIF style sign to this day, one of the few reminders of the companies' time at the port.

References

Defunct ferry companies of the United Kingdom
Defunct ferry companies of the Channel Islands
Ferry companies of England
Ferry companies of Jersey
Ferry companies of Guernsey
Connections across the English Channel
Transport companies established in 1984
Transport companies disestablished in 1994
1994 disestablishments in the United Kingdom
British companies established in 1984
Defunct companies of Jersey
Defunct companies of Guernsey